Michael Glogauer is a Canadian dentist, scientist, and scholar. He is a fellow of the Canadian Academy of Health Sciences and currently serves as a professor of dentistry at the University of Toronto. He also currently serves as chief of dentistry for the University Health Network and head of dental oncology at the Princess Margaret Cancer Centre.

He is known for his research on neutrophils and the immune system, COVID-19, and oral health.

Education 
Glogauer earned his PhD in Periodontal Physiology and his Doctorate of Dental Surgery from the University of Toronto. After graduating from the University of Toronto, he completed clinical and research fellowships at Harvard University and the Brigham and Women's Hospital.

Career 
Glogauer served as an associate professor at the University of Toronto until being promoted to his current position as a professor in the Faculty of Dentistry. In 2018, Glogauer was named a fellow by the Canadian Academy of Health Sciences.

Glogauer founded Ostia Sciences in 2019. It was his second company after founding the dental clinic OMG Perio. He also serves as dentist-in-chief at the University Health Network  and head of dental oncology at Princess Margaret Cancer Centre.

He has also served as a scientific advisor for pharmaceutical company Mesentech, chief scientific officer for Oral Science International, and Laboratory Research Director at Centre for Advanced Dental Research and Care at Mount Sinai Hospital.

Glogauer has served as vice-president and president of the Canadian Association for Dental Research. He also served as an editorial advisor for the Journal of the Canadian Dental Association.

Research 
Glogauer has done extensive research on neutrophils, periodontal disease, and the effects of socio-economic status on oral health. His work published in more than 90 peer reviewed publications (h index of 66) and has been cited in academic papers over 16,000 times.

Glogauer has invented a colorimetric diagnostic rinse for detecting periodontal pathogens, which has been licensed to Oral Sciences, Inc. for its PerioMonitor products.

Glogauer has received awards such as the CIHR New Investigator Award, the Dentistry Canada Biennial Research Award, and the International Association For Dental Research Edward R. Hatton Research Award for his research.

Selected publications 

 Fine, N., Hassanpour, S., Borenstein, A., Sima, C., Oveisi, M., Scholey, J., Cherney, D., & Glogauer, M. (2016). Distinct Oral Neutrophil Subsets Define Health and Periodontal Disease States. Journal of Dental Research, 95(8), 931–938. 
 Fabry, B., Maksym, G. N., Butler, J. P., Glogauer, M., Navajas, D., & Fredberg, J. J. (2001). Scaling the microrheology of living cells. Physical Review Letters, 87(14), 148102.
 Gomaa, N., Nicolau, B., Siddiqi, A., Tenenbaum, H., Glogauer, M., & Quinonez, C. (2017). How does the social "get under the gums"? The role of socio-economic position in the oral-systemic health link. Canadian Journal of Public Health, 108(3), e224-e228.
 Chapple, I. L., Mealey, B. L., Van Dyke, T. E., Bartold, P. M., Dommisch, H., Eickholz, P., Glogauer, M.,... & Yoshie, H. (2018). Periodontal health and gingival diseases and conditions on an intact and a reduced periodontium: Consensus report of workgroup 1 of the 2017 World Workshop on the Classification of Periodontal and Peri‐Implant Diseases and Conditions. Journal of periodontology, 89, S74-S84. 
 Kwiatkowski, D. J., Zhang, H., Bandura, J. L., Heiberger, K. M., Glogauer, M., el-Hashemite, N., & Onda, H. (2002). A mouse model of TSC1 reveals sex-dependent lethality from liver hemangiomas, and up-regulation of p70S6 kinase activity in Tsc1 null cells. Human molecular genetics, 11(5), 525–534. 
 Huang, J., Canadien, V., Lam, G. Y., Steinberg, B. E., Dinauer, M. C., Magalhaes, M. A., Glogauer, M., ... & Brumell, J. H. (2009). Activation of antibacterial autophagy by NADPH oxidases. Proceedings of the national academy of sciences, 106(15), 6226–6231.

References 

Living people
Canadian dentists
Canadian scientists
Year of birth missing (living people)